Nuclear receptor coactivator 6 is a protein that in humans is encoded by the NCOA6 gene.

Function 

The protein encoded by this gene is a transcriptional coactivator that can interact with nuclear hormone receptors to enhance their transcriptional activator functions. The encoded protein has been shown to be involved in the hormone-dependent coactivation of several receptors, including prostanoid, retinoid, vitamin D3, thyroid hormone, and steroid receptors. The encoded protein may also act as a general coactivator since it has been shown to interact with some basal transcription factors, histone acetyltransferases, and methyltransferases.

Interactions 
NCOA6 has been shown to interact with:

 ASCL2 and 
 Activating transcription factor 2, 
 Androgen receptor, 
 CREB-binding protein, 
 DNA-PKcs, 
 E2F1, 
 EP300, 
 Estrogen receptor alpha, 
 Estrogen receptor beta, 
 HBXIP, 
 HIST2H3C, 
 HSF1, 
 Ku70, 
 Ku80, 
 Liver X receptor beta, 
 MLL3, 
 RBBP5, 
 Retinoblastoma protein, 
 Retinoic acid receptor alpha, 
 Retinoid X receptor alpha,
 Src, 
 TGS1, 
 TUBA4A, 
 TUBB, 
 Thyroid hormone receptor alpha,  and
 Thyroid hormone receptor beta.

See also 
 Transcription coregulator

References

Further reading

External links 
 
 

Gene expression
Transcription coregulators
Human proteins